"When I See You" is a song by American singer Macy Gray from her third studio album, The Trouble with Being Myself (2003). It was released on January 27, 2003, as the album's only single. The single was released on two CD formats in the UK that contain remixes by Bugz in the Attic along with two unreleased B-sides: "Lie to Me" and "It's Love".

"When I See You" peaked at number 26 in the United Kingdom and number 40 in Australia. In the United States, the song reached number 21 on the Adult Top 40 chart and number 23 on the Hot Digital Tracks chart.

Track listings
 US 12-inch single
A1. "When I See You" (album version) – 3:43
A2. "When I See You" (Bugz in the Attic remix) – 6:32
B1. "My Fondest Childhood Memories" – 3:36

 UK CD1
 "When I See You" – 3:43
 "Lie to Me" – 5:32
 "It's Love" – 5:31

 UK CD2
 "When I See You" – 3:43
 "When I See You" (Bugz in the Attic remix) – 5:37
 "I Try" (Grand Style mix) – 4:57
 "When I See You" (video version) – 3:43

 European CD single
 "When I See You" – 3:43
 "When I See You" (Bugz in the Attic remix) – 5:37

 European maxi-CD single
 "When I See You" – 3:43
 "Lie to Me" – 5:32
 "It's Love" – 5:31
 "When I See You" (Bugz in the Attic remix) – 5:37
 "I Try" (Grand Style mix) – 4:57

 Australian CD single
 "When I See You" – 3:43
 "Lie to Me" – 5:32
 "It's Love" – 5:31
 "When I See You" (Bugz in the Attic remix) – 5:37

Charts

Release history

References

2003 singles
2003 songs
Epic Records singles
Macy Gray songs
Music videos directed by Bryan Barber
Song recordings produced by Dallas Austin
Songs written by Macy Gray
Songs written by Jeremy Ruzumna
Songs written by Justin Meldal-Johnsen
Songs written by Victor Indrizzo